Major-General Alec Wilfred Lee CB, MC (1896−1973) was a British Army officer who served in both of the world wars.

Military career
Born in 1896, Lee was initially educated at Clifton College. He saw service in World War I, where he was commissioned as an officer into the South Staffordshire Regiment of the British Army in 1914. This was followed by seeing active service on the Western Front, where he was awarded the Military Cross in 1915, and mentioned in dispatches six times throughout the war.

Remaining in the army during the interwar period, he received a promotion to captain in 1923 and went to India where he attended the Staff College, Quetta from 1926 to 1927. After this, he went to England to serve as an instructor at the Staff College, Camberley for the next four years. In 1937 he transferred to the Royal Irish Fusiliers and, two years later, received a promotion to colonel and experienced the death of his wife.

Lee served during World War II, initially as a staff officer with General Headquarters (GHQ) of the British Expeditionary Force (BEF) in France, for which he was mentioned in dispatches another time. After serving from late to 1940 until 1942 in the War Office in London as deputy director of Staff Duties, Lee, by now a brigadier, took command of the 44th (Home Counties) Division's 133rd Infantry Brigade until it was disbanded in 1943. In 1944 he was sent to India where he was Major-General in Command of Formation Training until later that year when he was sent to the United States to be Deputy Head of the British Army Staff in Washington, D.C.

He remained in this post until 1947, during which time he also served as aide-de-camp to the King, until he retired from the army, and was remarried, that same year, after well over thirty years of service. From 1954 to 1959 he was Colonel Commandant of his old regiment, the South Staffords, as well as Colonel of the Staffordshire Regiment, formed by the merger of the South Staffords with the North Staffordshire Regiment, from 1959 to 1961. In addition to being a keen sportsman, he also wrote pieces for the Encyclopædia Britannica and married again, for the third time, in 1970.

References

Bibliography

External links
Generals of World War II

British Army major generals
British Army generals of World War II
British Army personnel of World War I
Companions of the Order of the Bath
Recipients of the Military Cross
South Staffordshire Regiment officers
Graduates of the Staff College, Quetta
Academics of the Staff College, Camberley
Royal Irish Fusiliers officers
People educated at Clifton College
War Office personnel in World War II
Italian front (World War I)
Staffordshire Regiment officers
1896 births
1973 deaths